Zákány is a village in Hungary which is located in Somogy County next to the Croatian border.

Location of Zákány
Located in Southern Transdanubia, next to the Croatian border and river Dráva.

Nearest Cities:

Csurgó:16 km

Nagykanizsa:20 km

History of Zákány
The first mention of Zákány was in 1227 in the middle of the Mongol invasion of Europe when Zákány was called Zacun. In 1309 the people changed the village's name to Zakaan. The first refer to the village's castle was in 1325. In the 14th century (1332) the village had a parish.

External links 
 Satellite map (Hungarian)

References 

Populated places in Somogy County
Croatia–Hungary border crossings